Kue pukis or simply called Pukis is an Indonesian kue or traditional snack made of a wheat flour-based batter and cooked in a special mold pan. It is a commonly found snack in Indonesian traditional markets.

The mold pan is similar to muffin tin but has rectangular basins instead of rounded. It took form of a row of rectangular basins of small tubs with a rounded half-moon bottom, thus create a half-moon or boat-shaped hot cakes. Pukis mold is quite similar to waffle mold. The special grill-like metal mold used in making kue pukis is also used in other Indonesian traditional kue; including kue pancong (also known as bandros in West Java) and kue rangi (which is made with grated coconut and tapioca starch-batter instead), thus the shape is quite similar to those cakes. Although kue pukis mold is usually bigger than kue rangi mold. The taste however, is more akin to Indonesian kue cubit, Dutch poffertjes and Japanese dorayaki, due to similar wheat flour-based batter.

Ingredients and cooking method

The batter is made from the mixture of wheat flour, water, yeast, eggs, sugar, thick coconut milk, and salt; with vegetable oil, butter or margarine used to grease the cake mold to avoid it being stuck.

Sometimes the top of the cake is sprinkled with chocolate sprinkles, bits of peanuts, grated cheddar cheese or fermented cassava tapai.

Summary table
Kue pukis, kue pancong and kue rangi are quite similar, thus the three hot cakes are often mistakenly identified. The general differences between those three hot cakes are as follows:

See also 

 Kue cubit
 Kue khamir
 Kue putu
 Serabi
 Kue ape
 Dorayaki

References

External links

 Kue pukis recipe
 Kue pukis video in youtube

Kue
Foods containing coconut
Street food in Indonesia